Heads Up is an EP by American electronic music artist Bassnectar, released November 4, 2008 on Amorphous Music. The title track, "Heads Up", was originally a song to be seen on an upcoming full length titled The Other Side but never came to fruition, as Cozza Frenzy was released shortly after. "Lucy In The Sky With Diamonds Remix" was an exclusive CD only track.

Track listing

References

2009 albums
Bassnectar albums